VF4 can refer to

Vanadium(IV) fluoride, a chemical compound with a formula VF4
Virtua Fighter 4, a video game